Fuks may refer to:

 Fuks (surname), including a list of people with the name
 Fuks 1 and Fuks 2, two mass graves in Pameče, Slovenia

See also 
 Fusk, a village in Iran